Acalypha padifolia is a species of flowering plant in the family Euphorbiaceae. It is native to the Andes in Bolivia, Colombia, Ecuador, and Peru. It is a shrub or small tree that grows in mountain rainforests.

References

padifolia
Flora of Bolivia
Flora of Colombia
Flora of Ecuador
Flora of Peru
Taxonomy articles created by Polbot